Stomatin also known as human erythrocyte integral membrane protein band 7 is a protein that in humans is encoded by the STOM gene.

Clinical significance 

Stomatin is a 31 kDa integral membrane protein, named after the rare human haemolytic anaemia hereditary stomatocytosis. This gene encodes a member of a highly conserved family of integral membrane proteins. The encoded protein localizes to the cell membrane of red blood cells and other cell types, where it may regulate ion channels and transporters. Loss of localization of the encoded protein is associated with hereditary stomatocytosis, a form of hemolytic anemia.

Function 

This gene encodes a member of a highly conserved family of integral membrane proteins. The encoded protein localizes to the cell membrane of red blood cells and other cell types, where it may regulate ion channels and transporters. Loss of localization of the encoded protein is associated with hereditary stomatocytosis, a form of hemolytic anemia.

Although the wide distribution of stomatin and its constitutive expression suggest an important role for this protein in cell biology, perhaps as a “house-keeping” component, its function remains undetermined. The massive presence of stomatin in membrane-protruding folds and extensions suggests a possible structural role for this protein in the formation of these structures and/or the anchorage to the actin cytoskeleton.

References

Further reading

External links 
 

Membrane proteins